The Mount Horeb Earthworks Complex is an Adena culture group of earthworks in Lexington, Kentucky. It consists of two major components, the Mount Horeb Site 1 and the Peter Village enclosure, and several smaller features including the Grimes Village site, Tarleton Mound, and Fisher Mound. The Peter Village and Grimes Village enclosures were mapped by Rafinesque and featured in Squier and Davis's landmark publication Ancient Monuments of the Mississippi Valley in 1848 as Plate XIV Figures 3 and 4.

Mount Horeb Site 1
In 1939 the site was excavated by William S. Webb and the Works Projects Administration. They discovered the postholes of a circular wooden structure on the platform, which Webb speculated was a ceremonial center for a nearby clan. The  timber circle was made up of 132 posts, 62 "paired" posts and 8 single posts. It is currently owned and operated by the University of Kentucky as part of the Campus Recreation Department.

Peter Village enclosure
The earliest occupation at this site is 300 to 200 BCE and is considered to be a pre-Adena site for harvesting and processing galena, which occurs naturally nearby. An entryway to the enclosure was located to the south.

Images in Squier and Davis

Mount Horeb, described as "ancient work near Lexington, Kentucky," was featured in the 1848 book Ancient Monuments of the Mississippi Valley by Ephraim George Squier and Edwin Hamilton Davis.

See also
 Portsmouth Earthworks

References

External links
 Adena Park
 Earthworks Travel Guide

Adena culture
National Register of Historic Places in Lexington, Kentucky
Archaeological sites on the National Register of Historic Places in Kentucky
Former populated places in Kentucky
Mounds in Kentucky
Works Progress Administration in Kentucky
Historic districts on the National Register of Historic Places in Kentucky